Fausto Puccini (4 November 1932 – 1 April 2016) was an Italian equestrian. He competed at the 1976 Summer Olympics and the 1996 Summer Olympics.

References

1932 births
2016 deaths
Italian male equestrians
Italian dressage riders
Olympic equestrians of Italy
Equestrians at the 1976 Summer Olympics
Equestrians at the 1996 Summer Olympics
Sportspeople from Rome